The American Catholic Philosophical Association (ACPA) is an organization of Catholic philosophers established in 1926 to promote the advancement of philosophy as an intellectual discipline consonant with Catholic tradition. Among the means used to achieve this objective, the organization strives to develop philosophical scholarship, to improve the teaching of philosophy, and to communicate with other individuals and groups with similar aims.

The organization sponsors an annual conference and several scholarly publications, including a peer-reviewed journal, American Catholic Philosophical Quarterly, and the Proceedings of the American Catholic Philosophical Association. Individual and institutional members of the ACPA receive online access to all ACPA publications as a benefit of membership.

Memberships, conference registrations, and continuing publication of the journal and proceeding, in both print and electronic formats, are managed for the ACPA by the Philosophy Documentation Center.

Publications
 American Catholic Philosophical Quarterly, 1990–present
 The New Scholasticism, 1927–1989
 Philosophical Studies of the American Catholic Philosophical Association, 1938–1952
 Proceedings of the American Catholic Philosophical Association, 1927–present

Presidents

 1926–1928 Edward A. Pace
 1929 John F. McCormick
 1930 James H. Ryan
 1931 Gerald B. Phelan
 1932 James A. McWilliams
 1933 Charles C. Miltner
 1934 Francis Augustine Walsh
 1935 John O. Riedl
 1936 John J. Toohey
 1937 William T. Dillon
 1938 Ignatius Smith
 1939 William P. O'Connor
 1940 Francis E. McMahon
 1941 Fulton J. Sheen
 1942 Joseph Schabert
 1945 Leo R. Ward
 1946 
 1947 Joaquin Garcia
 1948 Vernon J. Bourke
 1950 Ernest Kilzer
 1951 Gerard Smith
 1952 Francis X. Meehan
 1953 
 1954 James Collins
 1955 Charles J. O'Neil
 1956 Vincent E. Smith
 1957 George P. Klubertanz
 1958 Allan Wolter
 1959 Lawrence E. Lynch
 1960 Robert Lechner
 1961 William M. Walton
 1962 Carl W. Grindel
 1963 Donald Gallagher
 1964 James A. Weisheipl
 1965 John A. Oesterle
 1966 Joseph Owens
 1967 Ernan McMullin
 1968 Robert J. Kreyche
 1969 W. Norris Clarke
 1970 William A. Wallace
 1971 Louis Dupré
 1972 Ralph McInerny
 1973 Gerald Kreyche
 1974 Thomas Langan
 1975 Jude P. Dougherty
 1976 Desmond J. FitzGerald
 1977 Mary T. Clark
 1978 Kenneth L. Schmitz
 1979 Armand A. Maurer
 1980 Henry B. Veatch
 1981 Leo Sweeney
 1982 John T. Noonan
 1983 Marc Griesbach
 1984 Germain Grisez
 1985 Cornelius F. Delaney
 1986 Francis J. Lescoe
 1987 John F. Wippel
 1988 John D. Caputo
 1989 Joseph Boyle
 1990 Gerald A. McCool
 1991 Frederick J. Crosson
 1992 Mary F. Rousseau
 1993 Lawrence Dewan
 1994 Thomas R. Flynn
 1995 Robert E. Wood
 1996 Thomas C. Anderson
 1997 Linda Zagzebski
 1998 Jorge J. E. Gracia
 1999 Thomas A. Russman 
 2000 Eleonore Stump
 2001 James F. Ross
 2002 Patrick L. Bourgeois
 2003 David B. Burrell
 2004 Nicholas Rescher
 2005 James L. Marsh
 2006 Anthony J. Lisska
 2007 Timothy B. Noone
 2008 William Desmond
 2009 Mary Beth Ingham
 2010 Therese-Anne Druart
 2011 Dominic Balestra
 2012 Richard Taylor (Marquette University)
 2013 John O'Callaghan
 2014 Daniel Dahlstrom
 2015 Jorge L. A. Garcia
 2016 Kevin Flannery
 2017 Thomas Hibbs
 2018 Francis Beckwith
 2019 Jean De Groot

References

External links

 American Catholic Philosophical Quarterly
 The New Scholasticism
 Proceedings of the American Catholic Philosophical Association
 Philosophical Studies of the American Catholic Philosophical Association
 Philosophy Documentation Center

Learned societies of the United States
Philosophical societies in the United States
Christian organizations based in the United States
Catholic organizations
1926 establishments in the United States
Christian organizations established in 1926